Acalolepta tenasserimensis is a species of beetle in the family Cerambycidae. It was described by Breuning in 1960. It is known from Myanmar and Malaysia.

References

Acalolepta
Beetles described in 1960